Samual Rogers (born May 17, 1999) is an American professional soccer player who plays as a center-back for Norwegian club Rosenborg.

Career
Rogers has been with the Seattle Sounders FC Academy since 2013. On February 23, 2017, it was announced that he signed a letter of intent to play college soccer at Villanova University. On June 13, 2017, he instead chose to forgo college to sign his first professional contract with the Seattle Sounders FC 2. Just six days later, on June 19, he graduated from Ballard High, a public high school located in north Seattle.

On March 26, 2017, he made his debut for USL club Seattle Sounders FC 2 in a 2–1 defeat to Sacramento Republic. Rogers scored his first goal for Seattle Sounders FC 2 on April 25, 2017, in a 3–2 loss to San Antonio.

In April 2021, Rogers signed with USL Championship side OKC Energy.

In August 2021, Rogers signed with Norwegian second-tier team HamKam on loan until the end of the season. After HamKam gained promotion, Rogers signed a contract for a permanent deal at the start of 2022. A month later Rosenborg, led by his former HamKam manager Kjetil Rekdal, completed the transfer of Rogers to Rosenborg.

Career statistics

Club

Updated

International

Honors
United States U20
 CONCACAF U-20 Championship: 2018

References

External links

US Soccer Development Academy bio
USSF Development Academy bio (demosphere)
|url=https://www.uslchampionship.com/sam-rogers

1999 births
Living people
American soccer players
Association football defenders
OKC Energy FC players
Soccer players from Seattle
Tacoma Defiance players
USL Championship players
United States men's under-20 international soccer players
United States men's international soccer players
Hamarkameratene players
Rosenborg BK players
Norwegian First Division players
American expatriate soccer players
Expatriate footballers in Norway
American expatriate sportspeople in Norway